The East India Company Act 1813 (53 Geo 3 c 155), also known as the Charter Act 1813, was an Act of the Parliament of the United Kingdom that renewed the charter issued to the British East India Company, and continued the Company's rule in India. However, the Company's commercial monopoly was ended, except for the tea and opium trade and the trade with China, this reflecting the growth of British power in India.

Contents 
The Act expressly asserted the Crown's sovereignty over British India, allotted 100,000 rupees annually for the improvement of literary and scientific knowledge, and permitted Christian missionaries to propagate English and preach their religion in Company's territories. The power of the provincial governments and courts in India over European British subjects was also strengthened by the Act, and financial provision was also made to encourage a revival in Indian literature and for the promotion of science.

Prior to the 1813 legislation, the British Parliament and the East India Company had refused to countenance missionary activity in India, and proscribed the Bible and forbade religious education, in support of a policy of religious neutrality and on the basis that, if exposed to Christianity, Indians may have felt threatened and thus would have posed a threat to British commercial ventures. The lifting of the prohibition, when it occurred, was not however a victory for missionaries, and did not precipitate official support for their activity; instead, they were subject to stringent checks.

The Company's charter had previously been renewed by the Charter Act 1793, and was next renewed by the Charter Act 1833.

Scholarly views
The literary critic and historian Gauri Viswanathan identifies two major changes to the relation between Britain and India that came about as the result of the Act: first, the assumption by the British of a new responsibility for Indian people's education; and, second, the relaxation of controls on missionary activity. Whereas previously educational provision was at the discretion of the Governor-General of Bengal, the Act overturned this laissez-faire status quo by establishing an obligation to promote Indian people's "interests and happiness" and "religious and moral improvement" – a responsibility the British state did not bear to British people at the time of the Act's passage. Viswanathan attributes the impetus for the new educational responsibilities to the mood in the English Parliament. Parliamentarians were concerned with the extravagant lifestyles of East India Company officials and the company's ruthless exploitation of natural resources, and, feeling that the British ought to lead by example but lacking the ability to curtail the activities of wealthy Nabobs, sought to remedy perceived injustices by seeking Indians' welfare and improvement.

See also
East India Company Act

References
East India Company Act 1813. Printed by George Eyre and Andrew Strahan, Printers to the King's most Excellent Majesty. London. 1813.
The Statutes: Second Revised Edition. 1889. Volume 3. Pages 811 to 820.
The Statutes: Revised Edition. 1877. Volume 5. Pages 278 to 287.
Andrew Lyon. A Guide to the Law of India. 1872. Pages 20, 67, 92 and 103. 1873. Volume 2. Pages 108, 112 and 295 to 298.
The Law Relating to India, and the East-India Company. Fourth Edition. Wm H Allen & Co. London. 1842. Pages 167 to 199.

United Kingdom Acts of Parliament 1813
1813 in the United Kingdom
1793 in India
Acts of the Parliament of the United Kingdom concerning India
British East India Company